Archbishop Hanna High School is a private, all male high school in Sonoma, California.  It was founded within the Roman Catholic Diocese of Santa Rosa.

Background
Archbishop Hanna High School is part of the Hanna Boys Center, a residential treatment center for troubled motivated youth.

Notes and references

External links
 

High schools in Sonoma County, California
Catholic secondary schools in California
Educational institutions established in 1949
1949 establishments in California
Roman Catholic Diocese of Santa Rosa
Buildings and structures in Sonoma, California
Boys' schools in the United States